Sarah Mansfield is an Australian politician from Geelong, Victoria. A member of the Greens, she has been a member of the Victorian Legislative Council since the 2022 Victorian state election, representing the Western Victoria Region.

Before her election, she was a councillor for the City of Greater Geelong, first elected in 2017 and again re-elected in 2020. She also worked as a general practitioner. Mansfield was also a candidate in the 2016 Australian federal election for the Corio Electorate.

References 

Living people
People from Geelong
Members of the Victorian Legislative Council
Women members of the Victorian Legislative Council
Australian Greens members of the Parliament of Victoria
Year of birth missing (living people)